Bertha Gyndykes Dkhar is a visually impaired  Indian educationist, best known as the inventor of the braille code in Khasi. In 2010, the Government of India awarded her with the Padma Shri, India's fourth highest civilian award.

Biography
Bertha Gyndykes Dkhar was born in Shillong, Meghalaya as a visually-impaired child with retinitis pigmentosa, a disease which causes degeneration of the retina, and lost the eyesight completely while she was in college due to which she had to abandon her studies. Without means to support herself, she sold fruits in the market for a living. Continuing with efforts to overcome the disability, Dkhar researched in Braille code and designed the code in Khasi, the local language in Meghalaya.

Bertha Dkhar is the headmistress of the Jyoti Sroat School, a school run by the Bethany Society for the visually impaired children. She received the fourth highest Indian civilian award of Padma Shri, when she featured in the 2010 Indian Republic Day honours list. She is also a recipient of the national award for Child Welfare from the Government of India in 2000.

See also
 Braille code

References

External links

Further reading

Living people
Recipients of the Padma Shri in literature & education
People from Shillong
Indian blind people
Indian women educational theorists
Khasi people
Braille
20th-century Indian educational theorists
Scientists from Meghalaya
20th-century Indian women scientists
20th-century Indian social scientists
Women scientists from Meghalaya
21st-century Indian social scientists
21st-century Indian women scientists
Women educators from Meghalaya
Educators from Meghalaya
Year of birth missing (living people)
Women school principals and headteachers
20th-century women educators
Scientists with disabilities